Craig Kielburger  (born December 17, 1982) is a Canadian human rights activist and social entrepreneur. He is the co-founder, with his brother Marc Kielburger, of the WE Charity, as well as We Day and the independent, social enterprise Me to We. On April 11, 2008, Kielburger was named a member of the Order of Canada.

Early life and education 
Craig Kielburger was born on December 17, 1982 in Thornhill, Ontario to Fred and Theresa Kielburger, two teachers and real estate investors.

He attended Blessed Scalabrini Catholic School, in Thornhill, and Mary Ward Catholic Secondary School in Scarborough, Toronto. In 2002, he entered the Peace and Conflict Studies program at the University of Toronto. In 2009, he completed the Kellogg-Schulich Executive MBA program at York University.

Activism

WE Charity 

In 1995, when Kielburger was 12 years old, he saw a headline in the Toronto Star about a Pakistani child labourer named Iqbal Masih who was killed for speaking out against the carpet industry. In December 1995, Kielburger travelled to Asia with Alam Rahman, a family friend from Bangladesh to see the condition of child labourers. While there, he met with then-prime minister of Canada, Jean Chrétien. Kielburger advocated for Canadian action on the issue of child labour, making headlines across Canada and internationally.

Upon his return, Kielburger was featured on 60 Minutes and the Oprah Winfrey Show. His trip was documented in the Judy Jackson documentary It Takes a Child. In 1999, Kielburger collaborated with novelist Kevin Major to write Free the Children, a book detailing his trip and the founding of Free The Children.

Kielburger's parents supported the early stages of the organization, which was initially headquartered in the Kielburger family home. The group collected 3,000 signatures for a petition to the prime minister of India calling for the release of imprisoned child labour activist Kailash Satyarthi. Satyarthi won the Nobel Peace Prize in 2014. On his eventual release, Satyarthi said, "It was one of the most powerful actions taken on my behalf, and for me, definitely the most memorable".

Kielburger's charity fundraised for organizations that raided factories and freed children from forced labour situations. When it became clear that the rescued children were being resold by their impoverished families, Free The Children began to fund school building projects in Nicaragua, Kenya, Ecuador and India. It later focused on education, water, health care, food security and income generation.

In 2016, Free The Children changed its name to WE Charity. The organization implements domestic programs for young people in Canada, the US and the UK, and international development programs in communities in Africa, Asia and Latin America. In July 2019, Kielburger opened an educational facility WE College in Narok County, Kenya with former Canadian prime minister Kim Campbell, Margaret Trudeau and Kenyan First Lady Margaret Kenyatta attending the event. In August 2019, Bill Morneau, the Canadian finance minister and Craig Kielburger announced that the federal government would be donating $3 million to the WE Social Entrepreneurs initiative.

On 9 September 2020, Craig and his brother Marc announced that they were winding down We Charity’s operations in Canada and establishing an endowment that will sustain ongoing We Charity projects around the world. The brothers attributed the decision to the financial condition of We Charity caused by the COVID-19 pandemic and the political controversy over the awarding of contracts from the Canadian government. Craig said that the decision to close We Charity would preserve life-saving projects, including hospitals, boarding schools, colleges for women, and food security programs.

Me to We 

In 2004, Craig and Marc Kielburger published Me to We: Finding Meaning in a Material World. The book included contributions from Oprah Winfrey, Archbishop Desmond Tutu and Dr. Jane Goodall, and outlined the tenets of the “ME to WE” philosophy, including the importance of community and the idea of service as a path to happiness.

In 2008, Kielburger co-founded ME to WE, a social enterprise that offers socially conscious products, leadership training and travel experiences. ME to WE donates a minimum half of its profits to its partner organization WE Charity, to support its operating costs and international development work and invests the other half back into growing the enterprise.

Controversy and criticism 

Craig Kielburger and fellow WE Charity co-founder Marc Kielburger announced they were pulling out of a $912 million Canada Student Grant contract because of the controversy the awarding of the contract raised. The contract with the We Charity had raised accusations of favoritism, since the government was outsourcing a massive federal aid program to a private organization with close ties to the prime minister. Following this, Opposition members of Parliament (MPs) asked the auditor general and the procurement ombudsman to investigate the contract, and other contracts awarded to We Charity over the years.

Public life 

Kielburger contributes a regular column called "Global Voices" for the Vancouver Sun, Halifax Chronicle Herald, Edmonton Journal, Victoria Times Colonist, Waterloo Region Record, Winnipeg Free Press, Huffington Post and Huffington Post Canada online.

He is the author of 12 books, several co-written with his brother Marc Kielburger Their latest publication (2018) is WEconomy: You Can Find Meaning, Make a Living, and Change the World, co-authored with Holly Branson, daughter of business magnate Richard Branson

In 2000, Kielburger was awarded $319,000 in damages as settlement for a libel suit launched against the now-defunct Saturday Night magazine. The settlement covered Kielburger's legal costs and the remainder was used to set up a trust fund for Free The Children.

In 2007, Kielburger was inducted into the Order of Canada.

In 2012, Craig Kielburger Secondary School opened in Milton, Ontario. The school was named Kielburger after a campaign by students.

In 2013, Kielburger was inducted into Canada's Walk of Fame, alongside his brother Marc Kielburger.

He participated in the 2015 edition of Canada Reads, advocating for Thomas King's book The Inconvenient Indian.

Honours

Awards 
 Reebok Human Rights Award
 World Economic Forum Global Leaders of Tomorrow Award, 1998
 Nelson Mandela Human Rights Award, 2003
 Action Canada Fellowship (2005-2006)
 EY & Schwab Foundation for Social Entrepreneurship Social Entrepreneur of the Year Award (2008)

Orders, decorations and medals 
  Meritorious Service Medal, Civil Division, 1997
  Ontario Medal for Good Citizenship, 1998
  Member of the Order of Canada, 2007
  Queen Elizabeth II Diamond Jubilee Medal, 2012

Commonwealth honours 
 Commonwealth honours

Scholastic 
Honorary degrees

Bibliography 
 Free the Children (1998)
 Me to We (with Marc Kielburger, 2004)
 Take Action (with Marc Kielburger, 2002) 
 Take More Action (with Marc Kielburger, 2008) 
 Making of an Activist (with Marc Kielburger, 2007)
 Global Voices: Volume 1 (with Marc Kielburger, 2010)
 Lessons From A Street Kid (2011)
 My Grandma Follows Me on Twitter (with Marc Kielburger, 2012)
 WEconomy (with Marc Kielburger and Holly Branson, 2018)

References 

1982 births
Canadian activists
Canadian humanitarians
Canadian Roman Catholics
Children's rights activists
Living people
Members of the Order of Canada
Recipients of the Meritorious Service Decoration
People from Thornhill, Ontario
Youth empowerment people
Trinity College (Canada) alumni
University of Toronto alumni
Schulich School of Business alumni
Toronto Star people
Writers from Toronto
Kellogg School of Management alumni
Recipients of the Four Freedoms Award
Canadian child activists
Canadian social entrepreneurs
WE Charity